Chinatown (Yale: Ngàuhchēséui) is a subzone and ethnic enclave located within the Outram district in the Central Area of Singapore. Featuring distinctly Chinese cultural elements, Chinatown has had a historically concentrated ethnic Chinese population. 

Chinatown is considerably less of an enclave than it once was. However, the precinct does retain significant historical and cultural significance. Large sections of it have been declared national heritage sites officially designated for conservation by the Urban Redevelopment Authority.

Etymology

Singapore's Chinatown is known as Niu che shui in Mandarin, Gû-chia-chúi in Hokkien and 	Ngàuh-chē-séui in Cantonese - all of which mean "bullock water-cart" - and Kreta Ayer in Malay (Post-1972 spelling: kereta air), which means "water cart". This is due to the fact that Chinatown's water supply was principally transported by animal-driven carts in the 19th century. Although these names are sometimes used for referring to Chinatown in general, they actually refer to the area of Kreta Ayer Road.

Geography
Chinatown consists of four distinctive sub-areas which were developed at different times.
Telok Ayer - developed in the 1820s. 
Kreta Ayer - developed in the 1830s
Bukit Pasoh - developed in early 1900s
Tanjong Pagar - developed in the 1920s
Chinatown Complex is located along Smith Street, which was known colloquially as hei yuan kai (theatre street) in Cantonese because of its famous Cantonese opera theatre Lai Chun Yuen, which opened in 1887 to cater to the Cantonese community there, drawing large crowds during the 1910s and 1920s (Nasir, 2005).

History

Development 

Under the Raffles Plan of Singapore, Chinatown originally was a division of colonial Singapore where Chinese immigrants tended to reside. Although as Singapore grew, Chinese immigrants settled in other areas of the island-city, Chinatown became overcrowded within decades of Singapore's founding in 1819 and remained such until many residents were relocated at the initiation of Singapore's governmental Housing Development Board in the 1960s.

In 1822, Sir Stamford Raffles wrote to Captain C. E. Davis, President of the Town Committee, and George Bonham and Alex L. Johnson, Esquires, and members, charging them with the task of "suggesting and carrying into effect such arrangements on this head, as may on the whole be most conducive to the comfort and security of the different classes of inhabitants and the general interests and welfare of the place..."

He went on to issue instructions, as a guide to the Committee, which included a general description of Singapore Town, the ground reserved by the government, the European town and principal mercantile establishments and the native divisions and "kampungs". These included areas for Bugis, Arabs, Indians, Malays and Chinese kampungs. Raffles was very clear in his instructions and his guidelines were to determine the urban structure of all subsequent development. The "five-foot way", for example, the continuous covered passage on either side of the street, was one of the public requirements.

Raffles foresaw the fact that "it may be presumed that they (the Chinese) will always form by far the largest portion of the community". For this reason, he appropriated all of the land southwest of the Singapore River for their accommodation but, at the same time, insisted that the different classes and the different provinces be concentrated in their separate quarters and that these quarters, in the event of fire, be constructed of masonry with tiled roofs.

This thus resulted in the formation of a distinct section titled Chinatown. However, only when parcels of land were leased or granted to the public in and after 1843 for the building of houses and shophouses, did Chinatown's physical development truly begin.

Legacy

The legacy of cultural diversity in Chinatown is still present. There used to exist some Hokkien merchants along Havelock Road, Telok Ayer Street, China Street and Chulia Street, and Teochew merchants are mostly in Circular Road, River Valley Road, Boat Quay and South Bridge Road near Chinatown. The ubiquitous Cantonese are scattered around South Bridge Road, Upper Cross Street, New Bridge Road and Bukit Pasoh Road as well as others. These days, the former Hokkien and Teochew residents have largely scattered to other parts of the island, leaving the Cantonese as the dominant dialect group in Chinatown. 

The Chinese names of Pickering Street are Kian Keng Khau (mouth of the gambling houses) or Ngo Tai Tiahn Hok Kiong Khau (mouth of the five generations of the Tian Hok Temple).

There are also several prominent century-old Chinese temples like  Hokkien Thian Hock Keng Temple at Telok Ayer Street, Teochew Wak Hai Cheng Bio Temple at Phillips Street, Siang Cho Keong Temple at Amoy Street, Seng Wong Beo Temple at Peck Seah Street and Cantonese Cundhi Gong Temple at Keong Siak Roadside.

Guilds, clans, trade unions and associations were all referred to as kongsi are present within Chinatown such as to assist to the needs of each Chinese dialect group, such as Cantonese, Hokkien, etc. 

There were the letter writers of Sago Street—in Hokkien this street is called Gu Chia Chwi Hi Hng Cheng (front of Kreta Ayer Theatre), but it was mainly associated with life and death — the sandalwood idols of Club Street and the complicated and simple food of Mosque Street; all rang to the sound of the abacus. Old women could be seen early in the mornings topping and tailing bean sprouts, the skins of frogs being peeled, the newly killed snakes being skinned and the centuries-old panaceas being dispensed by women blessed with the power of healing.

Besides Chinese residents, other races such as the Indians whom migrated during the British Raj live in Chinatown. Within the Chinatown is an important temple for the Tamils, the Sri Mariamman Hindu Tamil Temple, and also mosques, Al-Abrar Mosque at Telok Ayer Street and Jamae Mosque at Mosque Street. These places of worship catered to the pockets of non-Chinese residents in the area and shows that despite efforts to segregate the early immigrants, they had no qualms living peacefully together, and side by side.

Street name origins

 Mosque Street is named after Jamae Mosque, located on the South Bridge Road end of the street. The mosque was completed in 1830 by the Chulia Muslims from the Coromandel coast of South India but also used by the Malay Muslims living in the area. In the early years, Mosque Street was the site of ten stables.
 Pagoda Street takes its name from the Sri Mariamman Temple. During the 1850s and 1880s, the street was one of the centres of slave traffic. It also had its share of coolie quarters and opium smoking dens. One of the traders was Kwong Hup Yuen who, it is thought, occupied No. 37, and after whom Pagoda Street is often referred to today.
 Sago Lane and Sago Street got their name because in the 1840s there were a number of sago factories located there. Sago is taken from the pith of the rumbia palm and made into flour that is used for making cakes both sweet and savoury. Funerary businesses were formerly prominent on Sago Lane.
 Smith Street was probably named after Sir Cecil Clementi Smith, who was the Governor of the Straits Settlements between 1887 and 1893.
 Temple Street refers to the Sri Mariamman Temple, which is located at the South Bridge Road end of the street. It was formerly known as Almeida Street after Joaquim d'Almeida, son of José D'Almeida, who owned some land at the junction of Temple Street and Trengganu Street. In 1908, the Municipal Commissioners changed its name to Temple Street to avoid confusion with other streets in Singapore which were also named after D'Almeida.
 Trengganu Street, described as "the Piccadilly of Chinese Singapore" in the past, now forms the heart of the tourist belt in Chinatown. In Chinese, it is called gu chia chui wah koi, or "the cross street of Kreta Ayer". The crossing of streets refers to Smith Street and Sago streets. The street name is derived from Terengganu, a state in present-day Peninsular Malaysia.

Architecture

The street architecture of Chinatown's buildings, the shophouses especially, combine different elements of baroque architecture and Victorian architecture and do not have a single classification. Many of them were built in the style of painted ladies, and have been restored in that fashion. These styles result in a variety of different colours of which pastel is most dominant. Trengganu Street, Pagoda Street and Temple Street are such examples of this architecture, as well as development in Upper Cross Street and the houses in Club Street. Boat Quay was once a slave market along the Singapore River, Boat Quay has the most mixed-style shophouses on the island.

In 1843, when land titles were issued, the terraces in Pagoda Street (now with additions, mostly three-story) were born. They were originally back to back, an arrangement which made night soil collection difficult, but lanes were developed in between following the Singapore Improvement Trust (SIT) backlane orders of 1935.

The architectural character of many of the terraces in Chinatown is much more Italianate in style than those of, for instance Emerald Hill or Petain Road.  Windows often appear as mere slits with narrow timber jalousies (often with adjustable slats). Fanlights over the windows are usually quite decorative and the pilasters and balconies and even the plasterwork and colours seem to be Mediterranean in flavour. The style was probably introduced by those early Chinese immigrants (both China-born and Straits-born) who had knowledge of the Portuguese architecture of Macau, Malacca and Goa, while the Indians would also have been familiar with the European architecture there, although it is difficult to imagine how these people would have had a particularly strong influence on building in Chinatown.

Transportation
The Mass Rapid Transit MRT serves the area at Chinatown MRT station on the North East and Downtown lines, in the middle of pedestrian-only Pagoda Street, and serves the vicinity, as well as several public bus routes which integrates it into Singapore's transportation system. Nearby are the Tanjong Pagar MRT station on the East West MRT line; Outram Park MRT station, an interchange between the East West line and North East line; and Clarke Quay MRT station on the North East line, as well as a bus terminal called Kampong Bahru Bus Terminal.

Politics
Chinatown is divided between two Group Representation Constituencies (GRCs), Tanjong Pagar and Jalan Besar, in terms of representation in Parliament. Singapore's first Prime Minister, Lee Kuan Yew, was a Member of Parliament representing Tanjong Pagar GRC before his death in March 2015. After the September 2015 general election, Indranee Rajah now represents that part of Tanjong Pagar GRC. The Chinatown area that is part of Jalan Besar GRC is represented by Josephine Teo since 2020, following the retirement of Lily Neo after serving 23 years of politics from 1997.

Activity 
The shophouses were home to "death houses" until 1961, when death houses were banned, and brothels until 1930, when the Women and Girl's Protection Ordinance was enacted, bringing the prostitution
situation under control. To cater to those who visited brothels, or participated in extended affairs of Chinese funerals or came to frequent the opera theatre, street hawkers, food stalls and traders selling household goods occupied the streets. In order to address overcrowding and
poor living conditions in the city, all street hawkers were relocated into the newly built Kreta Ayer Complex in 1983, which is today's Chinatown Complex.

Gallery

See also
Chinatowns in Asia

References
Norman Edwards, Peter Keys (1996), Singapore – A Guide to Buildings, Streets, Places, Times Books International, 
Victor R Savage, Brenda S A Yeoh (2003), Toponymics – A Study of Singapore Street Names, Eastern Universities Press,

Notes

External links

Official Singapore Chinatown website
Chinatown Heritage Centre

Kreta Ayer on Visitsingapore.com
Kreta Ayer Community Centre website

 
Protected areas of Singapore
Tourist attractions in Singapore
Outram, Singapore
Singapore